St James is a small Roman Catholic church at 17 The Scores (next to the seashore) in St Andrews, Fife, Scotland.   The church was designed by Reginald Fairlie and built in 1910, replacing a former 'tin' church, and is a Category B listed building.

In 2019 the Parish Priest is Rev. Michael John Galbraith who is also RC Chaplain to the University of St Andrew's.

References

External links 
 St James RC Church, St Andrews on Scottish Church Heritage Research website

Category B listed buildings in Fife
Listed Roman Catholic churches in Scotland
1910 establishments in Scotland
Saint James
Roman Catholic churches completed in 1910